The Abkhazia national football team is the team representing the non-recognised state of Abkhazia. They are not affiliated with FIFA or UEFA, and therefore cannot compete for the FIFA World Cup or the UEFA European Championship.

They competed at the first ConIFA World Football Cup in 2014, finishing 8th overall, and they hosted and won the second edition in 2016.

History
After a revival in 2012, Abkhazia competed internationally under the umbrella of the CONIFA. The team made their debut in the CONIFA World Cup in 2014 and won the edition that they hosted in 2016.

In 2019, Abkhazia made their first appearance ever in the CONIFA European Cup, where they finished third.

International record

At CONIFA World Football Cup

At CONIFA European Football Cup

Results and fixtures

2020

2021

2022

Current squad
The following 23 players were called up to the squad for the 2019 CONIFA European Football Cup.

Top goalscorers
Only matches at CONIFA tournaments are counted.

Honours 
ConIFA World Football Cup
 Winners (1): 2016

CONIFA European Football Cup
 3rd place (1): 2019

Managers

See also
 Abkhazia national football team results (2012–2019)
 Abkhazia national football team results (2020–present)
 Abkhazia national football team results (unofficial matches)

References 

CONIFA member associations
European national and official selection-teams not affiliated to FIFA
national football team